A non-noradrenergic, non-cholinergic transmitter (NANC) is a neurotransmitter of the enteric nervous system (ENS) that is neither acetylcholine, norepinephrine, nor epinephrine.

Comparison table
This table compares different NANCs in the PNS:

References

Neurotransmitters
Autonomic nervous system